Korres is a hamlet and concejo located in the municipality of Arraia-Maeztu, in Álava province, Basque Country, Spain. The hamlet is located within the Izki Natural Park.

References

External links
 
Concejos in Arraia-Maeztu